Somebody Else, Not Me is a 1980 album by American folk and blues singer Dave Van Ronk.

Somebody Else, Not Me continues Van Ronk's return to basic blues, folk and jazz accompanying himself on guitar. It was reissued (with a slight change of name) as Someone Else, Not Me on CD by Philo in 1999. It was originally to be released in late 1970s as the follow-up to Sunday Street.

Reception

Writing for Allmusic, critic William Ruhlman wrote of the album "If the result was not quite the equal of Sunday Street, it was in the same league and continued Van Ronk's mature renaissance."

Track listing 
"Michigan Water Blues" (Clarence Williams) – 3:05
"Somebody Else, Not Me" (Van Ronk, Bert Williams) – 4:04
"Old Hannah" (Traditional) – 5:41
"The Entertainer" (Scott Joplin) – 4:57
"Did You Hear John Hurt?" (Tom Paxton) – 3:12
"Old Blue" (Traditional; arranged by Dave Van Ronk) – 3:50
"Sportin' Life" (Brownie McGhee) – 3:42
"Casey Jones" (Furry Lewis) – 4:46
"Pastures of Plenty" (Woody Guthrie) – 4:27
"Song to Woody" (Bob Dylan) – 3:57

Personnel
Dave Van Ronk – vocals, guitar

Production notes
Produced by Mitch Greenhill & Charles Eller
Mastered by Matt Murman
Liner notes by Dave Van Ronk
Photography by David Gahr
Design by Francisco Gonzalez
Reissue liner notes by Elijah Wald

References

1980 albums
Dave Van Ronk albums